Ospedaletto Euganeo is a comune (municipality) in the province of Padua in the Italian region of Veneto, located about  southwest of Venice and about  southwest of Padua.

The municipality of Ospedaletto Euganeo contains the frazioni (subdivisions, mainly villages and hamlets) Tresto, Palugana, Peagnola, Santa Croce, and Dossi.

Ospedaletto Euganeo borders the following municipalities: Carceri, Este, Lozzo Atestino, Noventa Vicentina, Ponso, Saletto, Santa Margherita d'Adige.

Demographic evolution

References 

Cities and towns in Veneto